Sean Lineen (born 25 December 1961) is a former Scotland international rugby union player. He was a former Head Coach of Glasgow Warriors from 2006 to 2012. He was a Director for the Scottish Rugby Union until December 2021.

Rugby Union career

Amateur career

Lineen played as a Centre.

Originally from New Zealand, in the 1985–86 season he made his first journey to the UK, playing for Pontypool in Wales. In October 1988 he came to Scotland and played for Boroughmuir.

Provincial career

He played for Edinburgh District.

He has been awarded the freedom of the city of Edinburgh.

He played for the Blues Trial side against the Reds Trial side on 6 January 1990. The Blues won the match 45 - 4.

International career

He qualified to play for Scotland through his grandfather and made his international debut on 21 January 1989 against Wales at Murrayfield aged 27.

Lineen played at 29 times for Scotland, He was a member of the notable Scottish Grand Slam team of 1990.

Coaching career

After his playing career ended, Lineen became a coach at Boroughmuir and during his time there he guided the side to cup and league triumphs. From this, Lineen was appointed assistant coach at Glasgow Warriors for the start of the 2003–04 season. He later became a member of the Scotland national coaching team under Frank Hadden in the summer of 2005, coaching the backs.

A previous player for Edinburgh District, Lineen had applied to be Head Coach of Edinburgh Rugby but the SRU insisted that the new coach of Edinburgh must already have experience as head coach.

However, with Hugh Campbell stepping down as Head Coach of the Glasgow Warriors in 2006, Lineen was ideally placed as the Assistant Coach to then make the step up. On 28 March 2006 he was appointed Head Coach of Glasgow Warriors. He was coach of the Warriors for 6 years and started laying the foundation of the side that Gregor Townsend would later build on.

After coaching the Warriors, Lineen then coached the Scotland Under 20 side; and then moved on to coach London Scottish.

Administrative career

He was made a Head of International Age-Grade Rugby at the Scottish Rugby Union.

In 2016 he was made a Director of Rugby at London Scottish.

He is now the Head of Player Acquisition at the Scottish Rugby Union.

Business career

He ran the Scottish Rugby magazine while coaching with Boroughmuir.

Family

He is the son of rugby player Terry Lineen.

References

External links
Glasgow Warriors announce new head coach – Glasgow Warriors official page, 28 March 2006
Lineen is the logical successor after Williams debacle – The Scotsman, 27 March 2005
Sean Lineen on Sporting Heroes

1961 births
Living people
Scottish rugby union players
Scotland international rugby union players
Scottish rugby union coaches
People associated with Edinburgh
New Zealand people of Scottish descent
Boroughmuir RFC players
Rugby union players from Auckland
Glasgow Warriors coaches
Scottish rugby union commentators
Edinburgh District (rugby union) players
Pontypool RFC players
Blues Trial players